Ben's Original, formerly called Uncle Ben's, is an American brand of parboiled rice and other related food products that were introduced by Converted Rice Inc., which is now owned by Mars, Inc. Uncle Ben's rice was first marketed in 1943 and was the top-selling rice in the United States until the 1990s. In 2020, it was rebranded as "Ben's Original" in the US following the George Floyd protests. The brand has historically capitalized on the long history of rice in African-American food culture and rice production in the US.

History 
In the 1910s, the German-British chemist Erich Huzenlaub (1888–1964) and the British chemist Francis Heron Rogers invented a form of parboiling designed to retain more of the nutrients in rice, now known as the Huzenlaub Process. The process entailed vacuum drying the whole grain, then steaming, and finally, vacuum drying and removal of the husk. This increased the rice's nutritional value, reduced cooking time, and made it resistant to weevils.

In 1932, Forrest Mars Sr. moved to the United Kingdom with a remit to expand the Mars food company internationally. While in the United Kingdom, Mars learned of Erich Huzenlaub's work with rice. Huzenlaub's London-based company was Rice Conversion Ltd. The two eventually formed Mars and Huzenlaub in Houston, Texas, which gave Forrest Mars partial ownership of the Huzenlaub Process rice conversion patent. In 1942, through Mars's guidance and sponsorship, Huzenlaub created, together with Houston food broker Gordon L. Harwell, the company Converted Rice, Inc., which sold its entire output to the U.S. and British armed forces. The advantage of this product was that it could be air-dropped to troops in the field without the risk of weevil infestation, and it could be cooked more quickly than other rice products.  Additionally, the converted rice product would retain more nutritional value. In 1944, with additional financing from the Defense Plant Corporation and an investment by Forrest Mars, it built a second large plant. In 1959, Forrest Mars purchased Erich Huzenlaub's interest in the company and merged it into his Food Manufacturers, Inc.

Uncle Ben's milling plant was on the Houston Ship Channel until 1999 when it moved to Greenville, Mississippi.

Marketing  

From 1946 to 2020, Uncle Ben's products carried the image of an elderly African-American man dressed in a bow tie, which is said to have been based on a house negro waiter. In 2020, Mars told Ad Age, "We don't know if a real 'Ben' ever existed." According to Mars, Uncle Ben was an enslaved African-American "house negro cook" known by the plantation owner and overseers for the quality of his rice dishes. Gordon L. Harwell, an entrepreneur who had supplied rice to the armed forces in World War II, chose the name "Uncle Ben's" as a means to expand his marketing efforts to the general public.

In March 2007, Uncle Ben's image was "promoted" to the "chairman of the board" by a new advertising campaign.

In September 2017, Mars, Inc. started to certify the sustainability of basmati rice sold under the Uncle Ben's brand to encourage local farmers to opt for the best agricultural methods.

In the aftermath of the murder of George Floyd, Mars, Inc. announced on June 17, 2020, that it would be "evolving" the brand's identity, including the logo. The move followed just hours after Quaker/PepsiCo changed the name and logo of its Aunt Jemima brand amid accusations of racism. As advertised on September 23, 2020, Mars Inc. replaced the "Uncle Ben's" name with "Ben's Original", with the new packaging becoming widely available in the United States from about June 2021.

References

External links 
 official website

Rice products
Products introduced in 1943
Fictional African-American people
Food advertising characters
Companies based in Houston
Mars brands
American brands
Male characters in advertising
Race-related controversies in advertising and marketing
Name changes due to the George Floyd protests